William Anslow Thornbery aka William Thornley (fl. 1858 – 1898) was an English marine painter, mainly of coastal scenes. He is generally identified with an artist signing as William A. Thornbery, and sometimes with the artist signing  William A. Thornbury in the 1880s. Close in style to Hubert Thornley, who also painted coastal scenes, he was possibly related.

References

1861 births
1898 deaths
19th-century English painters
English male painters
British marine artists
19th-century English male artists